Victor Jasper "Vic" Ferry DFC (11 January 1922 – 29 July 2007) was an Australian politician who was a member of the Legislative Council of Western Australia from 1965 to 1987, representing South-West Province.

Ferry was born in Albany, Western Australia, to Mary Eva (née MacLeod) and Roland Jasper Ferry. He attended Hale School, Perth, and afterward worked as a manager with the National Bank of Australasia. Ferry enlisted in the Royal Australian Air Force (RAAF) in 1942, as a flight lieutenant. He later transferred to the British Royal Air Force (RAF), and saw service as a pilot in Western Europe, North Africa, the Mediterranean, India, and Burma. He was awarded the Distinguished Flying Cross in 1944. After the war's end, Ferry returned to his job as a bank manager, living in Queensland for a time, and then in country Western Australia (including Boddington, Williams, and Manjimup). A member of the Liberal Party since 1949, he was elected to parliament at the 1965 state election, replacing the retiring James Murray in the Legislative Council. After the Liberals' victory at the 1974 election, Ferry was appointed government whip in the Legislative Council. In 1977, he was promoted to chairman of committees, serving in that position until his party's defeat at the 1983 election. Ferry left parliament in 1987, midway through his fourth six-year term. He retired to Perth, and lived in the RAAF retirement village at Merriwa until his death.

References

1922 births
2007 deaths
Australian World War II pilots
Liberal Party of Australia members of the Parliament of Western Australia
Members of the Western Australian Legislative Council
People educated at Hale School
People from Albany, Western Australia
Recipients of the Distinguished Flying Cross (United Kingdom)
Royal Air Force personnel of World War II
20th-century Australian politicians